is a 1964 Japanese documentary film directed by Susumu Hani. It was entered into the 4th Moscow International Film Festival where it won a Special Diploma.

References

External links
 

1964 films
1964 documentary films
Documentary films about special education
Japanese documentary films
1960s Japanese-language films
Japanese black-and-white films
Films directed by Susumu Hani
1960s Japanese films